UKCC may refer to:

United Kingdom Central Council for Nursing, Midwifery and Health Visiting before being renamed into the Nursing and Midwifery Council
Donetsk International Airport
UK Coaching Certificate